Sergei Gimayev may refer to:

Sergei Gimayev (ice hockey, born 1955) (1955–2017), Soviet professional ice hockey player
Sergei Gimayev (ice hockey, born 1984), Russian professional ice hockey player